Montrose is a station on the Chicago Transit Authority's 'L' system, serving the Blue Line. The station serves the Irving Park, Mayfair, and Portage Park neighborhoods. Blue Line trains run at intervals of 2–7 minutes during rush hour, and take 22 minutes to travel to the Loop. The station is located in the median of the Kennedy Expressway.  The station opened in 1970 as part of the Kennedy extension, connecting the Milwaukee Elevated from Logan Square to Jefferson Park.

A transfer is available to Metra's Milwaukee District North Line's Mayfair stop, just to the west of the station.

Bus and rail connections
Metra
Milwaukee District/North Line

CTA
  78 Montrose

References

External links

Montrose (O'Hare Line) Station Page
Montrose Avenue entrance from Google Maps Street View

CTA Blue Line stations
Railway stations in the United States opened in 1970